The former Prince Albert City Hall, now the Prince Albert Arts Centre, is a National Historic Site of Canada located  at 1010 Central Ave. Prince Albert, Saskatchewan, Canada.  Construction on this city Hall started in 1892, and was completed 1893.  A. and W.B. Goodfellow Builders built the city hall with clock tower, opera house, and meeting room.

As well as being a heritage site, it is still in operation today as the Prince Albert Arts Centre for various visual arts clubs and galleries for exhibitions, including the John V. Hicks Gallery, which features local and regional art exhibitions coordinated by the Prince Albert Council for the Arts.  Between 1911 and 1937, the old City Hall helped to house the Prince Albert Public Library in its upstairs rooms.

Footnotes

External links
Prince Albert Arts Centre
John V. Hicks Gallery
Prince Albert Historical Society introduction to site will include some pictures depicting
Parks Canada - National Historic Sites of Canada System Plan - Labour

Arts centres in Canada
Government buildings completed in 1893
Buildings and structures in Prince Albert, Saskatchewan
National Historic Sites in Saskatchewan
Art museums and galleries in Saskatchewan
Tourist attractions in Prince Albert, Saskatchewan